Gregorio Coppino, O.S.B. (1595–1645) was a Roman Catholic prelate who served as Bishop of Sant'Angelo dei Lombardi e Bisaccia (1645).

Biography
Gregorio Coppino was born in 1595 in Parma, Italy and ordained a priest in the Order of Saint Benedict.
On 12 Jun 1645, he was appointed during the papacy of Pope Innocent X as Bishop of Sant'Angelo dei Lombardi e Bisaccia.
On 18 Jun 1645, he was consecrated bishop by Giovanni Giacomo Panciroli, Cardinal-Priest of Santo Stefano al Monte Celio, with Alessandro Castracani, Bishop of Fano, and Ippolito Franconi, Bishop of Nocera de' Pagani, serving as co-consecrators. 
His term as Bishop of Sant'Angelo dei Lombardi e Bisaccia was short as he died in Oct 1645.

References

External links and additional sources
 (for Chronology of Bishops) 
 (for Chronology of Bishops) 

17th-century Italian Roman Catholic bishops
Bishops appointed by Pope Innocent X
1595 births
1645 deaths
Benedictine bishops
Religious leaders from Parma